Imagicaa is a  theme park in Khopoli, India. It is owned by Imagicaaworld Entertainment Ltd. The park has an estimated daily capacity of 15,000 visitors. To date, the park has hosted over 5.2 million visitors.

History 
The park opened in April 2013.

The park temporarily closed in March 2020 due to the COVID-19 pandemic.

Following a second lockdown due to the pandemic, Imagicaa reopened on 22 October 2021.

Parks

Main park 
The main park was 110 acres large at its opening. This space is split into six zones: Viva Europa, Americana, Jambo Africa, Asiana, Arabia and India.The park has three roller coasters: Nitro, Deep Space, and Gold Rush. The park also has the Scream Machine, a teacup ride, water-based bumper cars, and a carousel. One of the rides, "Mr. India", is based on the 1987 Bollywood film “Mr. India", starring Anil Kapoor, while another ride is based on animated character Chhota Bheem.

There are also some rides specifically for children, including a log flume ride, mini Ferris wheel, a mini drop ride, and a mini carousel. 

Several shows and attractions are also present within the park, including two movie experiences, a comedy show, an evening lights show, and "the first official Bollywood Hall of Fame".

Aquamagica 
The water park, which opened in 2014, includes water slides, a rafting ride, a mat racer, a lazy river, a wave pool, and a kiddie pool.

Snow park 
In 2016 the Imagicaa Snow Park, an indoor snow-based theme park, was opened. The park includes basketball, slides, a short hiking trail, play areas, and three cafes.

Events 
The park holds a special parade and carnival to celebrate Christmas.

References 

Amusement parks in India
Tourist attractions in Mumbai
2013 establishments in Maharashtra
Amusement parks opened in 2013